For other ships of the same name, see SMS Prinz Adalbert

SMS Prinz Adalbert  was an ironclad warship of the Prussian Navy and later the Imperial fleet. She was built in Bordeaux, France in 1864 for the Confederate States Navy. Prussia bought her during the Second Schleswig War against Denmark, but she was not delivered until after the war. She was designed as an armored ram but also carried three guns: one  and two  pieces in armored turrets. She was named after Prince Adalbert of Prussia, an early proponent of Prussian naval power.

The ship was poorly built and as a result had a very limited service career. She was heavily modified after her delivery to Prussia in 1865 and briefly served with the fleet between 1866 and 1871. During the Franco-Prussian War in 1870–1871, the ship was assigned as a guard ship in Hamburg. After the war, it was discovered that the internal wood construction was badly rotted; she was therefore removed from service in October 1871. Prinz Adalbert was stricken from the naval register in May 1878 and broken up for scrap that year.

Design

General characteristics and propulsion
The ship's hull was constructed from transverse frames, and included both iron and timber. The hull was sheathed in copper to protect it from parasites and biofouling and it featured a pronounced tumblehome. The Prussians regarded the ship as a poor seaboat. The ram bow caused the vessel to ship a great deal of water. It was, however, responsive to commands from the helm and had a very tight turning radius. Prinz Adalbert had a crew of ten officers and 120 enlisted men.

Prinz Adalberts propulsion system was provided by Mazeline, based in Le Havre. The engines were placed in a single engine room. Two rudders were fitted side by side to control the vessel and ensure good maneuverability, owing to the fact that the ram was its primary offensive weapon. The ship was initially fitted with a  brig sailing rig to supplement the steam engines, though this was subsequently replaced with a  topsail schooner rig.

Armament and armor 

As built, Prinz Adalbert was armed with a main battery of three rifled 36-pounder muzzle-loading guns. One was placed in an fixed five-port bow casemate, while the other two were located in a fixed two-port turret amidships. The guns were on movable pivot mounts to allow them to fire through the different firing ports. After delivery in 1865, the French guns were replaced with Krupp-built guns: a  L/19 gun was placed in the bow and two  L/25 guns in the central battery. The forward gun was supplied with 76 rounds of ammunition while the central guns had 71 shells each. Prinz Adalbert was armored with wrought iron, which was mounted on the wooden hull.

Service history 

Prinz Adalbert was built under the cover name Cheops along with a sister ship named Sphinx by the French shipyard of the Arman Brothers in Bordeaux. Nominally being built for the Egyptian Navy, they were actually intended for sale to the Confederate States of America. The French emperor, Napoleon III, intervened and ordered the Arman brothers to sell both vessels to another navy immediately. In early 1864 during the Second Schleswig War between the Prussian and Austrian alliance and Denmark, both the Prussian and Danish fleets sought vessels that could be purchased abroad. On 31 March, Denmark secured the contract for Sphinx but Cheops was sold to Prussia on 25 May. Delivery was delayed due to the war and the Prussians cancelled the order briefly before reinstating it in January 1865. The vessel was finally delivered in October and she was commissioned on the 29th of the month as Prinz Adalbert. 

Along with the turret ship , Prinz Adalbert was among the first armored vessels acquired by the Prussian Navy. The ship was named for Prince Adalbert of Prussia, one of the creators of the fleet. She was found to be in poor condition on entering service with the fleet, and while conducting trials off Denmark in June 1865, the ship ran aground. During the Austro-Prussian War in 1866, Prinz Adalbert was mobilized in Kiel under the command of Vizeadmiral (Vice Admiral) Eduard von Jachmann, but due to the lack of opponents in the North and Baltic Seas, the ship remained in the Baltic for the duration of the war.

The ship did not last long in service due to her poor construction, defects with her armor plate, she was unable to use her sailing rig, and her hull leaked badly; much of the fault lay with the use of low-quality wood in the construction of her hull. These problems necessitated significant refurbishment, which was carried out at the naval depot at Geestemünde in 1868–1869. Her armor plating had to be removed and reinstalled, a breakwater was installed at the stern of the ship, and the main mast had to be relocated. She was re-rigged to a schooner rig during this refit. Despite the repairs, Prinz Adalbert continued to suffer from severe leaking throughout her short career and she remained a poor sailing vessel. 

Prinz Adalbert, König Wilhelm, and Kronprinz continued on to Plymouth while Friedrich Carl returned to Kiel for repairs. The latter vessel quickly rejoined the ships there and on 1 July they departed for a training cruise to Fayal in the Azores, Portugal. But as tensions with France over the Hohenzollern candidacy for the vacant Spanish throne. While they cruised east through the English Channel, they learned of the increasing likelihood of war, and the Prussians detached Prinz Adalbert to Dartmouth to be kept informed of events. The rest of the squadron joined her there on 13 July, and as war seemed to be imminent, the Prussians ended the cruise and returned to home. Kronprinz had to take Prinz Adalbert under tow for the voyage due to the latter's slow speed.

The ships arrived back in Wilhelmshaven on 16 July, three days before France declared war on Prussia over the Ems Dispatch, initiating the Franco-Prussian War of 1870–1871. The greatly numerically inferior Prussian Navy assumed a defensive posture against a naval blockade imposed by the French Navy. For the duration of the conflict, Prinz Adalbert served as a harbor guard ship in Hamburg. Her timber hull was found to be rotten in 1871, which forced her decommissioning. She was removed from service on 23 October 1871 and disarmed in 1875–1876. The ship was formally stricken from the naval register on 28 May 1878. She was broken up that year in Wilhelmshaven, and her engines were removed and reused.

Footnotes

Notes

Citations

References 
 
 
 
 
 
 

Ships of the Prussian Navy
Ironclad warships of the Imperial German Navy
1864 ships
Ships built by Arman Brothers